Burra Burri is a locality in the Western Downs Region, Queensland, Australia.

History 
Burra Burri Provisional School and the Burra Burri Junction Provisional School opened in 1916, operating as half-time schools (sharing a teacher). In 1923 Burra Burri Junction Provisional School burned down and reopened under the name of Washpool Provisional School (still a half-time school with Burra Burri Provisional School). In 1927 the Burra Burri Provisional School was closed and on 16 May 1927 Washpool became a full-time state school. In 1957 Washpool State School was renamed Burra Burri State School.

The school celebrated its centenary on 10 September 2016.

Education 
Burra Burri State School is a government primary (Prep-6) school for boys and girls at 3173 Burra Burri Creek Road. In 2017, the school had an enrolment of 9 students with  4 teachers (2 full-time equivalent) and 5 non-teaching staff (2 full-time equivalent).

There is no secondary school in Burra Burri. The nearest secondary schools are in Jandowae (up to Year 10) or Chinchilla (up to Year 12).

Amenities 
Western Downs Regional Council operates the Burra Burri Hall on the corner of Burra Burri Darr Creek Road and Burra Burri Creek Road.

The Burra Burri branch of the Queensland Country Women's Association meets at the Burra Burri Hall.

References

Further reading 

 

Western Downs Region
Localities in Queensland